Carlo Gregor Boukhalfa (born 3 May 1999) is a German professional footballer who plays as a midfielder for  club FC St. Pauli.

Career
Boukhalfa made his professional debut for SC Freiburg in the first round of the 2020–21 DFB-Pokal on 13 September 2020, coming on as a half-time substitute for Yannik Keitel in the away match against 3. Liga side Waldhof Mannheim. In summer 2021, he was loaned to SSV Jahn Regensburg for one season.

On 27 May 2021, it was announced that Boukhalfa had signed for 2. Bundesliga club FC St. Pauli on a permanent basis.

References

External links
 
 
 

1999 births
Living people
Sportspeople from Freiburg im Breisgau
Footballers from Baden-Württemberg
German footballers
Algerian footballers
German people of Algerian descent
Association football midfielders
SC Freiburg players
SSV Jahn Regensburg players
FC St. Pauli players
Regionalliga players
2. Bundesliga players